Leptospermum blakelyi is a species of shrub that is endemic to rocky clifftops near Lithgow in New South Wales. It has densely silky young stems, egg-shaped to elliptical leaves and white or pink flowers.

Description
Young stems are densely hairy at first.

Taxonomy and naming
Leptospermum blakelyi was first formally described in 1989 by Joy Thompson in the journal Telopea. The specific epithet (blakelyi) honours William Blakely who wrote an unpublished description of this species.

Distribution and habitat
This tea-tree grows on rocky clifftops in heath near Lithgow.

References

blakelyi
Myrtales of Australia
Flora of New South Wales
Plants described in 1989